Chiang Yuen may refer to:

Chiang Yuen District, Maha Sarakham, Thailand
Wat Chiang Yuen, Buddhist temple in Chiang Mai, Thailand